The SEAT Altea Prototipo is a 2+2 seater concept car presented by SEAT for the first time at the 2003 Frankfurt Motor Show, the first SEAT model to be produced inside the Audi brand group, which was unveiled with the aim to give a preview of the SEAT Altea's definitive road version, which was meant to be launched a year later in 2004.

Designed by Walter de'Silva and belonging to what the Spanish car maker claims to be a 'Multi Sport Vehicle' (MSV) class denomination for a sporty single-volume people carrier, it has been named after the city of Altea in the Alicante province of Spain.

The Altea Prototipo incorporates the new SEAT's design direction trend reflecting the  'SEAT auto emoción'  philosophy, which was shown for the first time in the 2000 SEAT Salsa concept car, moreover featuring the characteristic for the brand lateral curved descending lines as well as the new front radiator grille.

Other interesting points are the windscreen wipers resting at vertical position, the non visible exterior rear door handles, and the Agile Chassis or Dynamic steering response (DSR) system meaning special suspension settings and fittings combined with an electronic programme that regulates power steering response according to driving and steering speed.

Awards

'Best Concept Car in 2003', by the Designers (Europe) organisation

Powertrain
Another novelty for the Altea Prototipo is found under the bonnet, it is the first model of SEAT to be powered by a direct injection petrol engine.
Type: FSI (Fuel Stratified Injection) Inline 4 cylinder petrol engine
Displacement : 2.0L
Power hp at RPM: 150 / 6,000

Transmission

Six speed automatic and sequential Tiptronic gearbox.

Suspension, brakes and tires
The Altea Prototipo is built on a new platform, sharing components with the Audi A3 Mark II.
Driveline: front wheel drive
Suspension: front MacPherson struts/rear multilink axle
Tires: 8.5J x 19h inch low profile alloy wheels
Brakes front/rear: vented disc/vented disc, ABS – Electronic Stability Program (ESP)

References
 

Altea Prototipo

es:SEAT Altea Prototipo